Ko Seung-wan (born December 4, 1981) is a South Korean male curler.

Teams

References

External links

Living people
1981 births
South Korean male curlers
Pacific-Asian curling champions
Curlers at the 2003 Asian Winter Games
Medalists at the 2003 Asian Winter Games
Asian Games medalists in curling
Asian Games gold medalists for South Korea
Universiade medalists in curling
Universiade bronze medalists for South Korea
Medalists at the 2003 Winter Universiade
Competitors at the 2007 Winter Universiade
21st-century South Korean people